Index Fungorum is an international project to index all formal names (scientific names) in the fungus kingdom.  the project is based at the Royal Botanic Gardens, Kew, one of three partners along with Landcare Research and the Institute of Microbiology, Chinese Academy of Sciences.

It is somewhat comparable to the International Plant Names Index (IPNI), in which the Royal Botanic Gardens is also involved. A difference is that where IPNI does not indicate correct names, the Index Fungorum does indicate the status of a name.  In the returns from the search page a currently correct name is indicated in green, while others are in blue (a few, aberrant usages of names are indicated in red).  All names are linked to pages giving the correct name, with lists of synonyms.

Index Fungorum is one of three nomenclatural repositories recognized by the Nomenclature Committee for Fungi; the others are MycoBank and Fungal Names.

Current names in Index Fungorum (Species Fungorum)
The main part of Index Fungorum is intended to be a global list of all fungus names which have ever been validly defined, but many of them are conflicting or no longer used.  Species Fungorum is a closely related project based at the Royal Botanical Gardens, Kew supported by CABI to decide a consistent subset of the Index Fungorum names which can be recommended as currently valid.  It is possible to search in either the Index Fungorum or the Species Fungorum list separately and the Index Fungorum results also give a cross-reference to Species Fungorum where an entry is available - names without such a reference are generally only of historical interest and should not be considered reliable for present use.

Life Science Identifiers (LSIDs)
Index Fungorum provides Life Science Identifiers (LSIDs) for records in its database.

Services
Index Fungorum provides a SOAP protocol web service for searching its database and retrieving records. A WSDL file describing the services is available.

See also
Australian Plant Name Index
Index Kewensis
International Plant Names Index

References

External links

Mycology
Online taxonomy databases